Tung Chung Bay is a bay west of Tung Chung, Lantau Island, Hong Kong, near North Lantau New Town and Hong Kong International Airport. It is also the location of Old Tung Chung Pier.

The bay flows out to South China Sea channel between Chek Lap Kok and to Tung Wan from a smaller to the east. 

The east side the bay is flanked by housing estates, while a forested area on the west side and an airport to the north.

Features
 Hau Wong Temple - south end of bay
 Ma Wan Chung Village - southeast end of bay
 Ngong Ping 360
 San Tau Beach Site of Special Scientific Interest (SSSI)
 Tung Chung Battery 
 Tung Chung Ma Wan Chung Pier
 Tung O Ancient Trail - hiking trail on southwest side of the bay

See also
 Blockade of Tung Chung Bay (1809)

References

Bays of Hong Kong
Tung Chung